Líadan is a feminine given name in the Irish language. Líadan or Liadan may refer to:

People
Líadan (poet), seventh-century Irish poet
St. Líadan, Irish abbess and mother of Ciarán of Saigir
 Líadan (folk group), an all-female Irish folk group

Fictional characters
Liadan, character in The Sevenwaters Trilogy
Liadan, character in Son of the Shadows
Liadan, character in Child of the Prophecy

See also
Liaden universe

References